Ceutholopha petalocosma is a species of snout moth in the genus Ceutholopha. It was described by Edward Meyrick in 1882 and is known from Australia.

References

Moths described in 1882
Phycitini